Psyllidae, the jumping plant lice or psyllids, are a family of small plant-feeding insects that tend to be very host-specific, i.e. each plant-louse species only feeds on one plant species (monophagous) or feeds on a few closely related plants (oligophagous). Together with aphids, phylloxerans, scale insects and whiteflies, they form the group called Sternorrhyncha, which is considered to be the most "primitive" group within the true bugs (Hemiptera). They have traditionally been considered a single family, Psyllidae, but recent classifications divide the group into a total of seven families; the present restricted definition still includes more than 70 genera in the Psyllidae.
Psyllid fossils have been found from the Early Permian before the flowering plants evolved. The explosive diversification of the flowering plants in the Cretaceous was paralleled by a massive diversification of associated insects, and many of the morphological and metabolic characters that the flowering plants exhibit may have evolved as defenses against herbivorous insects.

Several genera of psyllids, especially among the Australian fauna, secrete coverings called "lerps" over their bodies, presumably to conceal them from predators and parasites.

Genera
The following list is currently subject to review:
 Acizzia
 Agonoscena
 Allocarsidara
 Arytainilla
 Blastopsylla
 Boreioglycaspis
 Cacopsylla
 Cryptoneossa
 Ctenarytaina
 Diaphorina
 Eucalyptolyma
 Euphyllura
 Glycaspis
 Heteropsylla

 Prosopidopsylla
 Psylla
 Psyllopsis
 Retroacizzia
 Tetragonocephela

Higher taxonomy
Some genera, including agriculturally important pest species, have been classed as Psyllidae, but may now classified in the family Triozidae.

Coevolution

Insect-plant interactions have been important in defining models of coevolution and cospeciation, referring to whether plant speciation drives insect speciation and vice versa, though most herbivorous insects probably evolved long after the plants on which they feed.

Status as pests

Citrus greening, also known as huanglongbing, associated with the presence of a bacterium Liberibacter asiaticum, is an example of a plant pathogen that has coevolved with its insect vector, the "Asian citrus psyllid", ACP, Diaphorina citri, such that the pathogen causes little or no harm to the insect, but causes a major disease which can reduce citrus quality, flavor, and production, as well as causing citrus trees to die. ACP was found in Florida in 1998, and has since spread across the southern US into Texas. This disease was found in Florida citrus groves in 2005. Management methods to reduce the spread of this disease and psyllid populations depend on an integrated pest management approach using insecticides, parasitoids, predators, and pathogens specific to ACP.  Due to the spread of citrus greening worldwide and the growing importance of psyllid-spread diseases, an International Psyllid Genome Consortium was established.  Insect genomics provides important information on the genetic basis of the pest's biology which may be altered to suppress psyllid populations in an environmentally friendly manner.  The emerging psyllid genome continues to elucidate psyllid biology, expanding what is known about gene families, genetic variation, and gene expression in insects.  Thus far, two new psyllid viruses have been discovered, and are being examined as potential biological control agents to reduce psyllid populations.  Psyllid cell cultures have also been established by several researchers working with virus propagation, and as a system to propagate C. liberibacter for molecular studies on infection and replication.  Studies on the microbiota have also identified four new species of bacteria.  Thus far, 10 microbial organisms have been identified within these psyllids, among them the primary endosymbiont, whose genome has been sequenced and posted at the NCBI database, as well as a Wolbachia species.

References

External links 

On the University of Florida / Institute of Food and Agricultural Sciences Featured Creatures website
 Blastopsylla occidentalis, eucalyptus psyllid
 Boreioglycaspis melaleucae
 Diaphorina citri, Asian citrus psyllid
 Glycaspis brimblecombei, red gum lerp psyllid
 Pachypsylla venusta, hackberry petiole gall psyllid

 
Hemiptera families
Insect vectors of plant pathogens